The 1895 Yaroslavl Great Manufacture strike began in , in the Russian Empire.

Yaroslavl Great Manufacture was one of the biggest companies in Russia, out of about 70 in the city of Yaroslavl; it exported its linens to Europe. The company decided to establish new tariffs to reduce salaries, a decision which was not welcomed between workers.

4,000 workers participated in the strike. In response, a division of soldiers broke up their meeting, killing thirteen men.

The tsar Nicholas II, on a telegram about the official report, commented: «I am very satisfied with the way the troops behaved at Yaroslavl during these factory uprisings».

References 

1895 in the Russian Empire
Labour disputes in the Russian Empire
May 1895 events
1895 labor disputes and strikes
Textile and clothing strikes